The 1990 Moscow Victory Day Parade was held on May 9, 1990  to commemorate the 45th anniversary of the Victory of the Soviet Union in the Great Patriotic War. The parade was inspected by the USSR Minister of Defense Marshal Dmitry Yazov, and was commanded by the Commander of the Moscow Military District Colonel general Nikolai Vasilyevich Kalinin.

Overview
12.5 thousand people and 429 units of equipment took part in the parade. It was the last parade in the USSR on Red Square, dedicated to the victory in the Great Patriotic War. This is the first Victory Day parade which did not depict Vladimir Lenin's portrait on the Red Square and this practice continues to the present. This parade also featured a float featuring the Soldier-liberator Statue, the first-of-its-kind for a Soviet Victory Day Parade. On the eve of the parade, Gorbachev laid a wreath at the Tomb of the Unknown Soldier. A small parade featuring the Waltham American Legion Band was also held on Red Square following the massive parade, becoming the first American Band to ever play in Moscow.

Full order of the marchpast

Military bands 
 Massed Military Bands of the Moscow Military District

Ground column 
 Corps of Drums of the Moscow Military Music College
 Victory Banner Color Guard
 Front Standards
 Colour guard battalion of regimental, brigade and division colors of the Soviet Army
 Veterans regiment
 Heroes of the Soviet Union
 Recipients of the Order of Glory
 Veteran participants of the Moscow Victory Parade of 1945
 Partisans
 Civil awardees of the Order of Labour Glory
 Historical regiment
 M. V. Frunze Military Academy
 V. I. Lenin Military Political Academy
 Military Artillery Academy "Felix Dzerzhinsky"
 Military Armored Forces Academy Marshal Rodion Malinovsky 
 Military Engineering Academy
 Military Academy of Chemical Defense and Control
 Yuri Gagarin Air Force Academy
 Professor Nikolai Zhukovsky Air Force Engineering Academy
 M. V. Frunze Naval College
 Airborne Division
 Moscow Border Guards Institute of the Border Defence Forces of the KGB "Moscow City Council"
 OMSDON Ind. Motorized Division of the Internal Troops of the Ministry of Internal Affairs of the USSR "Felix Dzerzhinsky"
 Suvorov Military School
 Nakhimov Naval School
 Moscow Military High Command Training School "Supreme Soviet of the Russian SFSR"

During the transition period from the ground to mobile columns, 30 cadets from the Suvorov and Nakhimov schools marched to the grandstand to bring flowers to the Soviet leadership who attended.

Mobile Column 
 Historical column
 T-34
 SU-100
 ZIL-157
 ZIL-131
 Katyusha rocket launchers
 BRDM-2
 Modern column
 BTR-80
 BMP-2
 BMP-3
 BMD-1
 T-72
 T-80
 2S1 Gvozdika
 2S3 Akatsiya
 2S9 Nona
 BM-21 Grad
 BM-27 Uragan
 2A36 Giatsint-B
 9K35 Strela-10
 9K33 Osa
 S-300 missile system
 OTR-21 Tochka
 9K52 Luna-M
 R-17 Elbrus

Music 

The military band of the Armed Forces of the Soviet Union was commanded by Major General Nikolay Mikhailov.

 Inspection and address
 Jubilee Slow March "25 Years of the Red Army" (Юбилейный встречный марш "25 лет РККА) by Semyon Tchernetsky
 Slow March of the Tankmen (Встречный Марш Танкистов) by Semeon Tchenertsky
 Slow March of the Guards of the Navy (Гвардейский Встречный Марш Военно-Морского Флота) by Nikolai Pavlocich Ivanov-Radkevich
 Unknown March
 March of the Preobrazhensky Regiment (Марш Преображенского Полка)
 Slow March of the Officers Schools (Встречный Марш офицерских училищ) by Semyon Tchernetsky
 Slow March (Встречный Марш) by Dmitry Pertsev
 Slow March of the Red Army (Встречный Марш Красной Армии) by Semyon Tchernetsky
 Slow March Victory (Встречный Марш «Победа») by Yuriy Griboyedov
 Slow March (Встречный Марш) by Severian Ganichev
 Slow March of the Guards of the Navy (Гвардейский Встречный Марш Военно-Морского Флота) by Nikolai Pavlocich Ivanov-Radkevich
 Slow March (Встречный Марш) by Viktor Sergeyebich Runov
 Glory (Славься) by Mikhail Glinka
 Moscow Parade Fanfare (Московская Парадная Фанфара) by Unknown
 State Anthem of the Soviet Union (Государственный гимн Советского Союза) by Alexander Alexandrov
 Fanfare (Фанфара)

 Infantry Column
 Long Live Our State (Да здравствует наша держава) by Boris Alexandrov
 "The Sacred War" (Священная война) by Alexander Alexandrov
 Farewell of Slavianka (Прощание Славянки) by Vasiliy Agapkin
 We Need One Victory (Нам Нужна Одна Победа) by Bulat Shalvovich Okudzhava
 Victory Day (День Победы) by David Fyodorovich Tukhmanov
 March Victory (Марш Победа) by Albert Mikhailovich Arutyunov
 In Defense of the Homeland (В защиту Родины) by Viktor Sergeyevich Runov
 On Guard for the Peace (На страже Мира) by Boris Alexandrovich Diev
 Combat March (Строевой Марш) by Dmitry Illarionovich Pertsev
 Leningrad (Ленинград) by Viktor Sergeyeich Runov
 We are the Army of the People (Мы Армия Народа) by Georgy Viktorovich Mavsesyan
 Sports March (Спортивный Марш) by Valentin Volkov
 Victory Day (День Победы) by David Fyodorovich Tukhmanov
 Long Live our State (Да здравствует наша держава) by Boris Alexandrov

 Mobile Column and Conclusion
 My Dear Capital/My Moscow (Дорогая Моя Столица/Моя Москва) by Isaac Dunayevsky
 We Need One Victory (Нам Нужна Одна Победа) by Bulat Shalvovich Okudzhava
 Salute to Moscow (Салют Москвы) by Semyon Tchernetsky
 March of the Tankmen (Марш Танкистов) by Semyon Tchernetsky
 Song of the Soviet Army (Песня о Советской Армии) by Alexander Alexandrov

Other parades held in other cities 
For many republics, this was the last parade held before the independence day of their republic. Among these was the Latvian SSR, whose parade of the Baltic Military District took place on the bank of the Daugava in Riga, being received by Colonel General Fyodor Kuzmin, the commander of the district's troops. Parades were also held in cities such as Minsk (Belarusian SSR) and Kyiv Ukrainian SSR).

See also 
 Moscow Victory Day Parade

References 

1990 in the Soviet Union
1990 in military history
May 1990 events in Russia
Moscow Victory Day Parades